Microsoft Download Manager is a simple download manager for Windows that was published by Microsoft in 2011. It supports downloading files over HTTP and HTTPS and is usable in multiple languages. A Softpedia reviewer criticized the program, noting missing features compared to other download managers.

References

External links 
 Official website

Download managers
Windows-only freeware
Microsoft free software